Isabelle Autissier (born 18 October 1956) is a French sailor, navigator, writer, and broadcaster. She is celebrated for being the first woman to have completed a solo world navigation in competition (BOC Challenge 1990–91). Based in La Rochelle since 1980, she is also a writer and honorary president of WWF-France.

Childhood and early career 
Isabelle Autissier was born in the 12th arrondissement of Paris and later moved to the suburb of Saint-Maur-les-Fossés. She discovered sailing in Brittany from the age of six when her father, architect Jean Autissier, taught her and her sisters how to sail. 

She later graduated from the National Agronomy School of Rennes (École nationale supérieure agronomique de Rennes) with a degree in fisheries. In 1980, she carried out research on langoustines and large crustaceans. This research activity continued in La Rochelle under the aegis of IFREMER ('French Research Institute for Exploitation of the Sea'), where she studied the fisheries of the Bay of Biscay. From 1984 to 1990, she taught at the Maritime and Aquaculture School of La Rochelle.

Sailing career 
In 1991, she founded the International Monohull Open Class Association (IMOCA) with Christophe Auguin, Alain Gautier and Jean-Luc Van Den Heede, to bring together the skippers of 60-foot monohulls. 

Also in 1991, she finished 7th in The BOC Challenge, thereby becoming the first woman to race competitively  around-the-world solo. It was this success that prompted her to give up teaching to devote herself entirely to racing. 

Autissier was rescued on 1 January 1995 by a Seahawk helicopter launched from the Royal Australian Navy frigate, .

On her return, her newly acquired reputation enabled her to obtain the financial support of the Vendée company PRB (“Building Coatings Products”) and to hire the architect Jean-Marie Finot and the builder Marc Pinta to build her a new "IMOCA Open 60" boat. This means the boat design is regulated by measurement and safety rules, but, as long as those rules are respected, designers have considerable freedom.  

With her new boat – the PRB, launched in July 1996 – she took part in the Vendée Globe 1996-1997, a non-stop race during which she was disqualified after stopping in Cape Town to repair a damaged rudder. However, she set off again to finish the course out of the competition. With competitors facing extremely difficult conditions, Autissier turned around in the middle of a storm, along with other competitors, to try to find Gerry Roufs, whose Argos beacon had stopped emitting. The searchers were unable to find him and Roufs disappeared at sea in his boat, Groupe LG 2 in January 1997. Autissier resumed the course, fighting against extreme conditions which capsized her boat on several occasions. She arrived 4 days after the winner.

She capsized at 25 knots and her boat remained upside down. The Italian skipper Giovanni Soldini came to her rescue. This accident may have accelerated Autissier's decision to give up solo racing. She nevertheless continued to compete in crewed races.

She competed in the 1997–98 Whitbread Round the World Race on board EF Education.

Writing career and other activities 
Isabelle Autissier has also turned to writing. She has produced several stories and essays, as well as an opera libretto, Homo Loquax.  

In 2009, Isabelle Autissier published the novel Seule la mer s'en souviendra (Only the sea will remember"), the story of a deception at sea inspired by a real event – the Donald Crowhurst case in 1969.

In December 2009, she was elected president of the French branch of the World Wildlife Fund (WWF). In 2012, she presented Les contes d'Isabelle Autissier, a program broadcast every Sunday on France Inter. She also presented on France Inter the program, In extremis, during the summer. The show ended in 2016. She has since devoted herself to her charities, including the WWF.

See also 

 Florence Artaud
 Alain Colas
 Clarisse Crémer
 Michel Desjoyeaux
 Jean Le Cam
 Armel Le Cléac’h
 Bernard Moitessier
 Éric Tabarly 
 Jean-Luc Van Den Heede 
 Olivier de Kersauson

Bibliography 
 Une solitaire autour du monde (Alone around the World), with Éric Cocquerel (Arthaud, 1997)
 Kerguelen, le voyageur au pays de l'ombre (Kerguelen, the Traveller in the Land of Shadow), (Grasset, 2006)
 Salut au Grand Sud (Goodbye to the Great South), with Érik Orsenna, (Stock, 2006)
 Passer par le Nord. La nouvelle route maritime (Going through the North. The new sea route), with Érik Orsenna (Paulsen, 2014)
 Soudain, seuls (Stock, 2015)

References

Further reading

1956 births
Living people
Sportspeople from Paris
Officiers of the Légion d'honneur
Single-handed circumnavigating sailors
ISAF World Sailor of the Year (female)
Volvo Ocean Race sailors
French Vendee Globe sailors
1996 Vendee Globe sailors